Events in the year 1909 in Japan. It corresponds to Meiji 42 (明治42年) in the Japanese calendar.

Incumbents
Emperor: Emperor Meiji
Prime Minister: Katsura Tarō

Governors
Aichi Prefecture: Masaaki Nomura
Akita Prefecture: Mori Masataka
Aomori Prefecture: Takeda Chiyosaburo
Ehime Prefecture: Kensuke Ando then Takio Izawa
Fukui Prefecture: Nakamura Junkuro
Fukushima Prefecture: Shotaro Nishizawa
Gifu Prefecture: Sadakichi Usu
Gunma Prefecture: Uruji Kamiyama
Hiroshima Prefecture: Tadashi Munakata
Ibaraki Prefecture: Keisuke Sakanaka
Iwate Prefecture: Shinichi Kasai
Kagawa Prefecture: Motohiro Onoda
Kumamoto Prefecture: Kawaji Toshikyo
Kochi Prefecture: Kenzo Ishihara
Kyoto Prefecture: Kawaji Toshikyo
Mie Prefecture: Yoshisuke Arita
Miyagi Prefecture: Hiroyuki Terada
Miyazaki Prefecture: Tadayoshi Naokichi
Nagano Prefecture: Akira Oyama
Nara Prefecture: Raizo Wakabayashi
Niigata Prefecture: Prince Kiyoshi Honba
Okinawa Prefecture: Shigeaki Hibi
Osaka Prefecture: Tadashini Kikuchi
Saga Prefecture: Nishimura Mutsu
Saitama Prefecture: Shimada Gotaro
Shiname Prefecture: Maruyama Shigetoshi
Tochigi Prefecture: .....
Tokyo: Hiroshi Abe
Toyama Prefecture: Usami Katsuo
Yamagata Prefecture: Mabuchi Eitaro

Events
April 29 – Fusako, Princess Kane, seventh daughter of Emperor Meiji, marries Prince Naruhisa Kitashirakawa.
May 6 – Nobuko, Princess Fumi, eighth daughter of Emperor Meiji, marries Prince Yasuhiko Asaka
September 4 – Japan and China sign the Jiandao/Gando Treaty, which gives Japan a way to receive railroad concessions in Manchuria.
September 8 – A bottle glass, sheet glass and display product and sales brand, AGC was founded in Amagasaki, Hyogo Prefecture, as predecessor name was Asahi Glass. 
October Unknown date – Motorbike and compact car brand Suzuki founded, as predecessor name is Suzuki Weaving Machine Manufacturing.
October 26 – Itō Hirobumi, four time Prime Minister of Japan (the 1st, 5th, 7th and 10th) and Resident-General of Korea, is assassinated by An Jung-geun at the Harbin Railway Station in Manchuria.

Births
January 6 – Haruko Sugimura, film actress (d. 1997)
January 20 – Gōgen Yamaguchi, martial artist (d. 1989)
March 4 – Prince Tsuneyoshi Takeda (d. 1992)
March 6 – Shōhei Ōoka, writer (d. 1988)
March 9 – Shizue Natsukawa, actress (d. 1999)
March 27 – Eitaro Ozawa, actor (d. 1988)
March 29 – Kiyoteru Hanada, literary critic and essayist (d. 1974)
April 14 – Yoshikata Yoda, screenwriter (d. 1991)
May 5 – Atsushi Nakajima, author (d. 1942)
June 19
Osamu Dazai, writer (d. 1948)
Midori Naka, stage actress (d. 1945)
August 11 – Yuji Koseki, composer (d. 1989)
September 9 – Setsuko Matsudaira, wife of Prince Chichibu (d. 1995)
November 7
Ken Uehara, film actor (d. 1991)
Sadao Yamanaka, film director and screenwriter (d. 1938)
November 16 – Michio Mado, poet (d. 2014)
November 29 – Kinuyo Tanaka, film actress (d. 1977)
December 21 – Seichō Matsumoto, writer (d. 1992)

Deaths
May 10 – Futabatei Shimei, author, translator, and literary critic (b. 1864)
July 19 – Arai Ikunosuke, samurai, navy minister of the Republic of Ezo (b. 1836)
October 26 – Itō Hirobumi, statesman (b. 1841)
November 14 – Yamakawa Futaba, educator (b. 1844)
December 8 – Prince Kaya Kuninori (b. 1867)

References

 
1900s in Japan
Japan
Years of the 20th century in Japan